Detroit Lakes is a city in the State of Minnesota and the county seat of Becker County.  The population was 9,869 at the 2020 census. Its unofficial population during summer months is much higher, estimated by citizens to peak at 13,000 midsummers, due to seasonal residents and tourists.

U.S. Highways 10 and 59, and Minnesota State Highway 34 serve as the primary routes through the city. Detroit Lakes is located 45 miles east of the Fargo–Moorhead ND-MN statistical metropolitan area. The nearest major metropolitan area with a population over 1 million is Minneapolis–Saint Paul, which is approximately 205 miles southeast of Detroit Lakes.

Detroit Lakes is a regional summer and winter recreation destination, attracting large numbers of tourists and seasonal residents each year. Its economy is fueled by seasonal population increases, with tourism being the area's chief industry.

History
The city of Detroit Lakes was founded by Colonel George Johnston in 1871. The city's current name has been extant since 1927, to avoid confusion with Detroit, Michigan. Beforehand, it was simply called Detroit. The name was given by a French missionary. Détroit is French and translates to strait or narrows, referring to the sand bar separating Big Detroit lake from Little Detroit lake. The sand bar was dredged and partially submerged to make the Pelican River watershed navigable by steamboat in the late 19th century.

Detroit Lakes was a resting place on the Red River Oxcart Trails. The Ojibwe name for Detroit Lakes is "Gaiajawangag", meaning a lake with a crossing in a sandy place.

The city grew quickly with the construction of the Northern Pacific Railroad. In 1877, an election finally decided that Detroit Lakes, then still known as Detroit, was to become the county seat. Detroit won the election by a ninety percent majority. The nearby cities of Frazee, Lake Park, and Audubon were also in the running for the county seat. By 1884, Detroit Lakes had many businesses, including the Hotel Minnesota, the Lakes Hotel, a bank, a newspaper, and an opera house. The first county courthouse was built in Detroit Lakes that year also. Some of the city's historic buildings still stand, such as the 1908 railroad station and the historic Holmes Theater. The Becker County Museum, located near the Holmes Theater in Detroit Lakes, has information and exhibits on the history of the city and the surrounding area.

Geography

Climate

Demographics

2010 census
As of the census of 2010, there were 8,569 people, 3,864 households, and 2,093 families residing in the city. The racial makeup of the city was 90.6% White, 0.7% African American, 4.4% Native American, 0.8% Asian, 0.1% Pacific Islander, 0.6% from other races, and 2.9% from two or more races. Hispanic or Latino of any race were 1.6% of the population.

There were 3,864 households, of which 25.8% had children under the age of 18 living with them, 38.5% were married couples living together, 11.4% had a female householder with no husband present, 4.2% had a male householder with no wife present, and 45.8% were non-families. 39.3% of all households were made up of individuals, and 19.1% had someone living alone who was 65 years of age or older. The average household size was 2.13 and the average family size was 2.84.

The median age in the city was 41.6 years. 22% of residents were under the age of 18; 8.5% were between the ages of 18 and 24; 23.2% were from 25 to 44; 24.6% were from 45 to 64; and 21.8% were 65 years of age or older. The gender makeup of the city was 47.2% male and 52.8% female.

2000 census
As of the census of 2000, there were 7,348 people, 3,319 households, and 1,845 families permanently residing in the city. The racial makeup of the city was 91.98% White, 4.50% Native American, 0.53% Asian American, 0.42% African American, 0.01% Pacific Islander, 0.59% from other races, and 1.96% from two or more races. Hispanic or Latino of any race were 1.20% of the population.

There were 3,319 households, out of which 26.1% had children under the age of 18 living with them, 42.6% were married couples living together, 9.7% had a female householder with no husband present, and 44.4% were non-families. 40.2% of all households were made up of individuals, and 21.6% had someone living alone who was 65 years of age or older. The average household size was 2.13 and the average family size was 2.86.

In the city, the population was spread out, with 22.8% under the age of 18, 7.5% from 18 to 24, 24.4% from 25 to 44, 21.6% from 45 to 64, and 23.7% who were 65 years of age or older. The median age was 42 years. For every 100 females, there were 84.4 males. For every 100 females age 18 and over, there were 81.2 males.

The median income for a household in the city was $29,264, and the median income for a family was $42,267. Males had a median income of $28,939 versus $21,439 for females. The per capita income for the city was $18,509. About 9.9% of families and 15.0% of the population were below the poverty line, including 22.2% of those under age 18 and 13.9% of those age 65 or over.

Government
Detroit Lakes is the county seat of Becker County, with the county courthouse and law enforcement center. District headquarters for the Minnesota Department of Transportation and the Minnesota State Highway Patrol are also located in the city.

A nine-member City Council serves the city, with the mayor voting in case of a tie. There are three wards, with two council members serving each of the three primary wards and three serving the "at large" area.

There are 14 city boards and commissions, including the Park Board, Library Board, Public Utilities Commission, Planning Commission, Police Civil Service Commission, the Housing and Redevelopment Authority, the Airport Commission, and the Tourism Bureau.

Detroit Lakes is located in Minnesota's 7th congressional district, represented by Michelle Fischbach. The city is in Minnesota Senate District 4 after 2012 redistricting, represented by Kent Eken (DFL), and Minnesota House District 4B, represented by Paul Marquart (DFL).

Education

Higher education
The Detroit Lakes campus of the Minnesota State Community and Technical College system is one of four campus locations (others are in Moorhead, Fergus Falls, and Wadena). The Detroit Lakes campus, located on Minnesota Highway 34, enrolls approximately 650 students in 25 different degree programs. The college offers both classroom and online distance education programs and grants AAS, AS, diploma, certificate, and AFA degrees.

K–12
Rossman Elementary School (K–5)
Roosevelt Elementary School (K–4)
Detroit Lakes Middle School (5–8) (Only 5th grade from Roosevelt)
Detroit Lakes High School (9–12)
Lakes Area Learning Center Alternative High School (ALC) (9–12)
Holy Rosary Catholic School (K–8) (Private)
Faith Christian School (K–8) (Private)
Adventist Christian School (K–8) (Private)

Carnegie Library
Built in 1913 with a $10,000 grant from the Andrew Carnegie Foundation, the Detroit Lakes Public Library is a branch of the Lake Agassiz Regional Library Network (LARL). Originally  on two floors, the library was designed by the architectural firm of Claude and Starck of Madison, Wisconsin. The building today is on the National Register of Historic Places. Most notably, the building features a Louis Sullivan exterior frieze, lead and stained glass windows and doors, and a completely open and unobstructed interior. The building, designed in the prairie school architectural style popularized by such architects as Louis Sullivan and Frank Lloyd Wright, is also noted for its orange clay-tiled hip roof that defies regional construction convention. In 1985, due to space issues, the original Carnegie building was expanded.

Architecture

National Register of Historic Places

Numerous works of architecture and engineering in Detroit Lakes have been added to the National Register of Historic Places. The Detroit Lakes Carnegie Library of the Prairie School architectural style, by architects Claude and Starck and significant of the period from 1900 to 1924, was added to the Register in 1976. The Graystone Hotel, significant of the periods 1900–1924 and 1925–1949, was added in 1999. The Amtrak Depot, formerly the Northern Pacific Passenger Depot and later the Burlington Northern Depot, significant of the periods 1900–1924 and 1925–1949, now primarily serving as a small shop and eatery, was added in 1988. The Homer E. Sargent House on Lake Avenue, currently a privately owned domestic dwelling of the Queen Anne architectural style and significant of the periods 1875–1899 and 1900–1924, was added to the Register in 1988. The Edgewater Beach Cottages, also known as Stovewood Cottages, by architects George Jewell and Frederick Wright and significant of the period 1925–1949, were added in 1989. Fairyland Cottages Historic District on W. Lake Shore Drive, significant of the period 1925–1949, were added to the National Register in 1989. Finally, the Holmes Block (also known as the Opera House Block), including downtown commercial buildings occupying addresses 710–718 Washington Avenue, are significant of various historical periods ranging from 1875 to 1974. The downtown block was added to the National Register in 2001.

Economy
The city's economy is largely driven by summer tourism and seasonal population increases. A variety of health care services, retail stores, and service businesses are available to area residents and tourists. Detroit Lakes is home to approximately 15 chain and independent hotels. Numerous resorts in the area provide many additional units. The city's downtown offers a  shopping center, including Washington Square Mall. Most newer chain retail businesses, including discount and home centers, restaurants, and strip malls, are located along Highways 10 and 59. The city is also home to a number of businesses servicing tourism ranging from sporting goods retailers to amusement parks and river tubing companies. With two industrial parks in the city's outskirts, it is also home to many manufacturing and industrial businesses.

Recreation
In and around Detroit Lakes are several lakes used for fishing, boating, wake sports, sailing, jet-skiing, swimming, and freshwater scuba diving. Most prominent and heavily used is Detroit Lake, which features the mile-long city beach. The beach annually hosts the city's Independence Day celebration and fireworks display.  In and around Detroit Lakes are 14 golf courses. The area also features an amusement park, a paintball arena, two river tubing companies, and a horseback riding ranch. The city also hosts the annual Becker County Fair. The Shrine Circus performs in Detroit Lakes each year at the Kent Freeman Arena. In the winter off-season, the area remains a popular recreation destination for ice fishing, snowmobiling, cross country skiing and downhill skiing and snowboarding at the newly renovated Detroit Mountain Recreation Area. The city is one of perhaps five in the Nation that has a park dedicated to the Grand Army of the Republic (rededicated on April 15, 2015).

Culture

Historic Holmes Theatre

The Historic Holmes Theatre, a physical and organizational branch of the Detroit Lakes Community and Cultural Center complex, is a recently renovated Art Deco theatre that hosts year-round music, drama and dance performances. With seating for nearly 1,000, the theatre features a wide variety of professional national and international touring shows (including Arlo Guthrie, the Chinese Golden Acrobats, the New York Theatre Ballet, and the Guthrie Theater), local performing groups (Playhouse 412, Fargo/Moorhead Jazz Arts Group, Wadena Madhatters) and events (wedding receptions, business meetings, and Detroit Lakes' Annual Festival of the Birds).

Music Festivals
Each August since 1983, the city has hosted WE Fest, a prominent camping and country music festival. Campgrounds packed with tents surround a large stage, and the three-day concert attracts around 50,000 music-lovers each summer. In 2007, the attendance reached a record high of 83,000 people over the weekend at the themed "Heavin in '07" concert. The music festival is held annually at the Soo Pass Ranch on Highway 59 south of Detroit Lakes.

Formerly held in July each year at the Soo Pass Ranch venue, the 10,000 Lakes Festival was put on hiatus as of December 18, 2009. According to 10KLF.com the festival could not grow to financial success.

Community & Cultural Center
A recently built Community & Cultural Center serves Detroit Lakes, incorporating a new fitness center with the completely renovated brick building that once was the Holmes School. The fitness and aquatic area features an 8-lane Olympic regulation pool, an indoor track, a fieldhouse featuring 2 basketball courts, a weight room, cardio fitness center, racquetball courts, and a golf driving/putting range. The old 1931 school building houses the renovated 837-seat Historic Holmes Theatre featuring orchestra and balcony level seating, and conference rooms.

Religion
There are several Christian churches in and around the city of Detroit Lakes. In greatest number are Lutheran churches of varied synods. In addition to Holy Rosary Church (Roman Catholic), the city contains one of each of the following denominational churches: Episcopal Church, United Methodist, Assemblies of God, United Church of Christ, Mennonite, The Church of Jesus Christ of Latter-day Saints, Jehovah's Witnesses, Seventh-day Adventist Church, Community Alliance Church Christian & Missionary Alliance, Vineyard Church. There is also an interdenominational Christian Fellowship Church. At present, no religious denominations outside of Christianity have places of worship in Detroit Lakes.

Local media

Radio
FM

Television
TV3: Lakes Area Television (News/Local Programming)

TV3 is a "commercial supported Public-access television cable TV station" that broadcasts out of Detroit Lakes for the regional Arvig Communication Cable System.

Newspaper
The Forum Communications Company of Fargo, North Dakota, owns and operates the Detroit Lakes Tribune (twice weekly publication) and also provides the regional daily newspaper, The Forum of Fargo-Moorhead, with coverage spanning the Fargo–Moorhead metropolitan area and much of northwest Minnesota and northeast North Dakota.
The Forum of Fargo-Moorhead (daily)
The Detroit Lakes Tribune (published on Wednesdays and Saturdays)
White Earth - Anishinaabeg Today

Transportation
 Amtrak Empire Builder (stops daily at Detroit Lakes' Amtrak station)
 Jefferson Lines Intercity Bus Line
 Detroit Lakes Airport
 DL Taxi Services
 Becker County Transit
 Clay County Rural Transit
 White Earth Transit

In popular culture
Detroit Lakes is referred to in the author John Steinbeck's book, 'Travels with Charley, depicting his 1960 road trip across the United States with his dog, Charley. In the novel, Steinbeck purports to have passed through and stayed the night near Detroit Lakes.

A postcard depicting the Fairyland Cottages in Detroit Lakes appear in the opening credits of the 1983 movie National Lampoon's Vacation, though the cabins no longer stand as they were destroyed in May 2008 by the Detroit Lakes Fire Department, in a training exercise. It is now home to a condominium complex.

A fictional version of Detroit Lakes' courthouse and rural countryside is featured in Ali Selim's 2006 independent film Sweet Land, a love story revolving around a German immigrant's settlement in rural Becker County, Minnesota in the aftermath of World War I. The scene was filmed in Montevideo, Minnesota.

The late Ed Schultz, former MSNBC anchor of the eponymous Ed show, often taped or broadcast his show live from a studio in Detroit Lakes.

The 2016 Netflix documentary, The Seventh Fire, exposing gang culture on American Indian Reservations, was filmed on location in Detroit Lakes, surrounding towns, and the nearby White Earth Indian Reservation.

A popular YouTube channel named CBOYSTV films and is Headquartered at nearby Cormorant Lake (8 Miles East of Detroit Lake). CBoysTV is an American comedy and motorsports channel consisting of 5 guys. Their channel has amassed over 1 million subscribers.

Notable people
Tillie Anderson, prominent in bicycle racing in the 1890s, spent summers at a lakeside cabin, died there in 1965
Dick Beardsley, marathon runner, motivational speaker and author, third-fastest American-born male marathon runner, Grandma's Marathon record holder, Boston Marathon silver medalist (1982), founder of Dick Beardsley Running Company, formerly resided in Detroit Lakes
Jason Blake, retired NHL player, resides in Detroit Lakes
James Evans, Minnesota state legislator, resided in Detroit Lakes
Mary Evelyn Fredenburg, nurse missionary in Nigeria, born in Detroit Lakes in 1923
Phil Hansen, retired NFL player, Buffalo Bills defensive end 1991–2001, three-time Super Bowl participant, resides in Detroit Lakes
Jessica Lange, Oscar-winning actress, briefly resided in Detroit Lakes, where she attended her junior year of high school (ca. 1966)
Collin Peterson, former Congressman, chair of House Agriculture Committee, Democratic-Farmer-Labor Party, 7th Congressional District of Minnesota, resides in Detroit Lakes
Dennis Poppenhagen, Minnesota state legislator and businessman, resides in Detroit Lakes
Dave Reichert, former Congressman, Republican Party, 8th Congressional District of Washington, was born in Detroit Lakes
Ed Schultz, former syndicated talk radio host, cable news anchor of The Ed Show on MSNBC, seasonally resided in Detroit Lakes until his death in 2018
Caroline Smith, musician, singer/songwriter for Indie Rock band Caroline Smith and the Goodnight Sleeps, grew up in Detroit Lakes
Adam Thielen, wide receiver for the Minnesota Vikings of the National Football League, was born and grew up in Detroit Lakes
Loren P. Thompson, Minnesota state legislator, resided in Detroit Lakes from 2009 until his death
Harriet Hilreth Weeks, Minnesota state legislator, resided in Detroit Lakes

References

External links

City of Detroit Lakes
Detroit Lakes Regional Chamber of Commerce website
Detroit Lakes website
WE-FEST website
10,000 Lakes Festival website
Minnesota State Community & Technical College website
Detroit Lakes Public Library website
Detroit Lakes Photo Gallery
http://www.outsideonline.com/2314716/seamstress-conquered-bike-racing-1890s

Cities in Becker County, Minnesota
Cities in Minnesota
County seats in Minnesota